The 2013–14 Inter-National League season was the second season of the Inter-National League, a multi-national ice hockey league consisting of teams from Austria and Slovenia. The league contained 16 teams. The league's top scorer was Dylan Stanley.

Teams
EHC Bregenzerwald	
VEU Feldkirch
EHC Lustenau 
EK Zell am See
HK Triglav Kranj	 
HK Slavija Ljubljana
HK MK Bled
HK Celje
Team Jesenice
HDK Maribor
ASV Kaltern
HC Neumarkt-Egna
HC Merano 
HC Appiano
HC Gherdeina

Previous season
2012–13 Inter-National League season

References

External links
 Inter-National-League on the Austrian Ice Hockey Federation website

Inter-National League seasons
1
2013–14 in Austrian ice hockey leagues
2013–14 in Slovenian ice hockey